The Best of Crosby & Nash: The ABC Years is a compilation album from the duo of David Crosby and Graham Nash which was remastered and released in 2002. The album features music that appeared on Wind on the Water, Whistling Down the Wire and Crosby-Nash Live.

Track listing
 "Carry Me" (David Crosby)
 "Mama Lion" (Graham Nash)
 "Bittersweet" (Crosby)
 "Take the Money and Run" (Nash, Rafferty)
 "Naked in the Rain" (Crosby, Nash)
 "Love Work Out" (Nash)
 "Homeward Through the Haze" (Crosby)
 "To the Last Whale...  (A. Critical Mass/B. Wind on the Water)" (Crosby, Nash)
 "Spotlight" (Danny Kortchmar, Nash)
 "Broken Bird" (Crosby, Nash)
 "Time After Time" (Crosby)
 "Mutiny" (Nash)
 "Taken at All" (Crosby, Nash)
 "Foolish Man" (Crosby)
 "Out of the Darkness" (Crosby, Craig Doerge, Nash)
 "Immigration Man" (Live) (Nash)
 "Lee Shore" (Live) (Crosby)
 "I Used to Be a King" (Live) (Nash)
 "Déjà Vu" (Live) (Crosby)

References

External links
 Crosby & Nash Official Website

Albums produced by Stephen Barncard
2002 greatest hits albums
MCA Records compilation albums
Crosby & Nash compilation albums